= Stuart Gilson =

American economist

Stuart C. Gilson is an American economist currently the Steven R. Fenster Professor of Business Administration at Harvard Business School.
